

Systemically Important Banks

Globally Systemically Important Banks
UBS Group AG (including Credit Suisse)

Domestically Systemically Important Banks
 Zurich Cantonal Bank
 Banque cantonale vaudoise
 Raiffeisen
 PostFinance

Top-tier Swiss banks

Other Swiss-based banks with a significant presence domestically and overseas with considerable assets under management.
Julius Baer Group
Vontobel
Pictet Group
Lombard Odier
J. Safra Sarasin
Union Bancaire Privee
EFG International

Family-owned Swiss banks
Banque Heritage
Bank SYZ
Bordier & Cie
Compagnie Bancaire Helvétique
Edmond de Rothschild Group
Geneva Swiss Bank
Gonet & Cie
E. Gutzwiller & Cie, Banquiers
Habib Bank AG Zurich
Landolt & Cie
Lienhardt & Partner Privatbank Zürich
Reichmuth & Co
REYL Group
Union Bancaire Privée
Rahn+Bodmer Co.
Vontobel

Swiss branches of international banks

Belgium
AXA Bank Europe, Brüssel, Zweigniederlassung Winterthur
Fortis Banque, SA/NV, Bruxelles, Succursale de Zurich
STRATEO, Genève, Succursale de Keytrade Bank SA, Bruxelles, Geneva

Brazil
Itaú Private Bank, Zürich

Denmark
Jyske Bank (Schweiz) AG
Nordea Bank S.A., Luxemburg, Zweigniederlassung Zürich

France
Banque du Léman SA, Geneva
BNP Paribas (Suisse) SA, Geneva
Crédit Agricole (Suisse) SA, Geneva
Société Générale Private Banking (Suisse) SA, Geneva

Germany
Deutsche Bank (Suisse) SA, Geneva

Israel
Bank Hapoalim (Switzerland) Ltd
Bank Leumi (Schweiz) AG, Geneva
IDB (Swiss) Bank Ltd, Geneva
United Mizrahi Bank (Schweiz) AG

Italy
Intesa Sanpaolo, Geneva
Sella Bank AG, Geneva
UniCredit (Suisse) Bank SA, Zurich

Japan
Mitsubishi UFJ Wealth Management Bank (Switzerland), Ltd.
Nomura Bank (Schweiz) AG

Lebanon
Banque Audi (Suisse) SA, Geneva

Liechtenstein
LGT Bank (Schweiz) AG, Basel

Luxembourg
KBL (Switzerland) Ltd, Geneva

Middle East
Arab Bank (Switzerland) Ltd, Geneva
NBAD Private Bank (Suisse) SA, Geneva
NBK Banque Privée (Suisse) SA, Geneva
QNB Banque Privée (Suisse) SA, Geneva

Netherlands
Credit Europe Bank (SA), Geneva
Van Lanschot Switzerland, Zurich

Portugal
Banque Privée BCP (Suisse) SA, Geneva

Russia

Sberbank, Zurich
VTB Capital, Zug

South Africa
Investec Bank (Switzerland) AG

Spain
Banco Santander (Suisse) SA, Geneva
NCG Banco S.A., succursale de Genève, Geneva

United Kingdom
Barclays Bank (Suisse) SA, Geneva
Barclays Capital, Zurich Branch of Barclays Bank PLC, London
HSBC Private Bank (Suisse) SA, Geneva
IG Bank S.A., Geneva
Lloyds Bank plc, Londres, succursale de Genève, Geneva
*Standard Chartered Bank (Switzerland) SA (No offices anymore in Switzerland)

United States
Citibank, NA, Las Vegas, Succursale de Genève
Citibank, NA, Las Vegas, Zurich Branch
Goldman Sachs Bank AG
JPMorgan Chase Bank, National Association, Columbus, Succursale de Zurich
J.P. Morgan (Suisse) SA, Geneva
Merrill Lynch Capital Markets AG
Morgan Stanley AG
State Street Bank GmbH, München, Zweigniederlassung Zürich

See also 
 Banking in Switzerland
 List of banks in Europe
 List of banks (alphabetically)

References

External links
Directory of Authorized Banking Institutions licensed by FINMA.
Foreign Banks in Switzerland Association

Switzerland
 
Banks
Switzerland
Banks